Praseodymium(III) acetate is an inorganic salt composed of a Praseodymium atom trication and three acetate groups as anions. This compound commonly forms the dihydrate, Pr(O2C2H3)3·2H2O.

Preparation
Praseodymium(III) acetate can be formed by the reaction of acetic acid and praseodymium(III) oxide:

Praseodymium(III) carbonate and praseodymium(III) hydroxide can also be used:

↑

Decomposition
When the dihydrate is heated, it decomposes to the anhydrous, which then decomposes into praseodymium(III) oxyacetate(PrO(O2C2H3)) then to praseodymium(III) oxycarbonate, and at last to praseodymium(III) oxide.

See also
 Neodymium acetate
 Praseodymium
 Acetic acid
 Lanthanide

References 

Praseodymium compounds
Acetates
Electron microscopy stains